Tepeköy is a village in Bergama district of İzmir Province, Turkey. It is situated at the northern banks of Bakırçay river and south west of Bergama. The population of the village is  1134  as of 2010.

References

Villages in Bergama District